Yunus Ali Enayetpuri (1886–1951), or simply Khwaja Enayetpuri , was a Sufi saint.

Personal life 
Born in 1886, he studied from the age of 17 for 18 years under Syed Wajid Ali in Calcutta. He is believed to have been descended from Sayyids from Baghdad, but the records were destroyed in a fire on Chaitra 26, 1330 (1924 AD). Khwaja died in 1952.

Teachings 
Khwaja's teachings focused on Tajalli, divine illumination, and his followers numbered in the hundreds of thousands. Khwaja Enayetpuri developed a tripartite teaching method, "by writing", "by lecture" and "by khanqah".

His Sufi order influences and is influenced by four other Sufi orders: Qadiri, Chishti, Naqshbandi and Mujaddediya, with special influence from Naqshbandi (Mujaddidi), and he is specifically credited with introducing the Mujaddediya order to Bangladesh. A Sufi revival in then-East Pakistan is attributed to Khwaja's outreach to Muslims skeptical of Sufism, including his work reconciling Sharia and Sufism (tariqa). He wrote two books, Shariyater Alo (The Light of Sharia) and Ganje Asrar (The City of Mystery), about Sharia and Sufism respectively.

Legacy 
The institutions Khwaja Yunus Ali University and Khwaja Yunus Ali Medical College are named after Khwaja. The institutions were founded by a follower and son-in-law of Khwaja's, M. M. Amjad Hussain, with the location of the medical college having been purportedly selected by Khwaja during his lifetime. A ro-ro ferry is also named after Khwaja, the M/F “ENAYETPURI”.

Khanqahs (Sufi centres) in Bangladesh dedicated to Khwaja Enayetpuri and established by his devotees include:

 The Enayetpur Darbar Sharif, the initial khanqah, established by Khwaja himself, and the largest of all khanqahs in Bangladesh. This Sufi Centre is widely known as "Biswa Shanti Manzil" (The World Peace Centre). 
 The Shambhuganj Darbar Sharif in Mymensingh
 The Biswa Zaker Manzil (The World Zaker Centre, established in Atroshi by the pir of Atroshi, and one of the largest khanqahs founded by Khwaja's disciples)
 The Chandra Para Darbar Sharif in Faridpur
 The Paradise Para Darbar Sharif in Tangail founded by Mowlana Makim Uddin, one of the closest disciples of Khwaja Enayetpuri. 
 Murshidpur Darbar Sharif in Jamalpur

The Enayetpur Darbar Sharif khanqah is led by the spiritual leader, Kamal Uddin, the third son of  Enayetpuri and the current sajjada nashin (Sufi master) of the khanqah. Khwaja Kamal Uddin is an authority on the Naqshbandi and Mujaddidi orders. He succeeded his brothers Khwaja Hasim Uddin and Khwaja Mozammel Huq, former sajjada nashin at the khanqah.

References 

Bengali Sufi saints
1886 births
1951 deaths
Bengali Muslim scholars of Islam
20th-century Bengalis